Cupressus duclouxiana, known commonly as the Chinese cypress or Yunnan cypress, is a species of conifer in the cypress family, Cupressaceae. It is endemic to China, where it is known from Yunnan and Sichuan. It grows in deep river gorges. Its habitat is mountain forest where it occurs alongside the Sikang pine (Pinus densata) and various oaks, chinquapins, and chestnuts.

Most old-growth stands of this tree have been cut down, and it is still threatened by logging in many areas.

References

duclouxiana
Endemic flora of China
Trees of China
Endangered flora of Asia
Plants described in 1914
Taxonomy articles created by Polbot